Dieter Bast (born 28 August 1951) is a former German footballer.

Career
In total Bast played 412 Bundesliga games and scored 54 goals. His Bundesliga debut took place on his 19th birthday for Rot-Weiss Essen. He quickly established himself amongst the squad, however, in search of title-chasing football, he went to VfL Bochum where he played 192 games, and from 1983 until 1986, he played for Bayer Leverkusen. In 1986, he returned to Rot-Weiss Essen in the 2. Bundesliga where he played until his retirement in 1989.

Bast played in the Under-23 national team in 1973, and in the National second team between 1976–77. Even though he played Bundesliga football for fifteen steady years, he failed to win a trophy for any team in which he played.

Statistics

1 Includes Regionalliga Promotion Playoffs.

References

External links
 

1951 births
Living people
Sportspeople from Oberhausen
German footballers
Germany B international footballers
Germany under-21 international footballers
Bundesliga players
2. Bundesliga players
Rot-Weiss Essen players
VfL Bochum players
Bayer 04 Leverkusen players
Olympic footballers of West Germany
West German footballers
Footballers at the 1984 Summer Olympics
Association football defenders
Footballers from North Rhine-Westphalia